Samuel Abbott Ferrin (January 19, 1831March 29, 1875) was a Canadian American, immigrant, medical doctor, and Republican politician.  He was a member of the Wisconsin State Assembly, representing Grant County during the 1872 session.  He also served as a hospital steward and surgeon in the Union Army during the American Civil War.

Biography
Ferrin was born on January 19, 1831, in what is now Saint-Thomas, Quebec. He graduated from Rush Medical College. During the American Civil War, Ferrin originally enlisted with the 32nd Wisconsin Infantry Regiment of the Union Army. He later became a surgeon in Wingville, Wisconsin and was commissioned First Assistant Surgeon of the 44th Wisconsin Infantry Regiment.

Political career
Ferrin was a member of the Assembly during the 1872 session. He was a Republican.

References

External links

1831 births
1875 deaths
19th-century American politicians
People from Lanaudière
Pre-Confederation Quebec people
People from Grant County, Wisconsin
Republican Party members of the Wisconsin State Assembly
People of Wisconsin in the American Civil War
Union Army surgeons
Physicians from Wisconsin
Rush Medical College alumni